Danielle Ruth Fotopoulos (born March 24, 1976) is an American soccer coach and former player. Fotopoulos holds the all-time National Collegiate Athletic Association (NCAA) Division I records for goals and points, and was a member of the University of Florida team that won the 1998 NCAA women's soccer championship, and also the United States national team that won the 1999 FIFA Women's World Cup. She was the head coach of the Eckerd women's soccer team until 2022.

Early life
Fotopoulos was born in Camp Hill, Pennsylvania in 1976, the daughter of Bill and Donna Garrett.  She grew up in Altamonte Springs, Florida, and attended Lyman High School in Longwood, Florida from 1990 to 1994.  While in high school, she was a varsity letterman in six different sports—basketball, cross country, soccer, tennis, swimming and track & field.  Her high school soccer team won three Florida state championships during her four years on the team.

College career
Fotopoulos initially attended Southern Methodist University (SMU) in Dallas, Texas, where she played for the SMU Mustangs soccer team from 1994 to 1995. After her sophomore year, she transferred from SMU to the University of Florida in Gainesville, Florida, where she played for coach Becky Burleigh's new Florida Gators women's soccer team for two seasons. She suffered an ACL injury before the start of the 1997 season and returned to the Gators for her senior year in 1998. She helped the Gators win the 1998 NCAA Women's Soccer Championship, scoring the winning goal against North Carolina in the final of the NCAA soccer tournament.  During her 1996 and 1998 seasons with the Gators, the team also won both the Southeastern Conference (SEC) regular season and tournament championships, and she was twice recognized as the SEC Player of the Year.  Fotopoulos finished her college career as the NCAA's all-time leader in goals (118) and points (284).  She was the 1998–99 recipient of the Honda Sports Award for Soccer, recognizing her as the outstanding collegiate women's soccer player of the year.

She graduated from Florida with a bachelor's degree in 1999, and was inducted into the University of Florida Athletic Hall of Fame as a "Gator Great" in 2008.

Professional career
Fotopoulos played professionally with the Carolina Courage of the Women's United Soccer Association, winning the league championship in 2002. She was also a member of the United States Women's National Soccer team.

Coaching career
Fotopoulos is married to former Louisiana State University (LSU) women's soccer team head coach George Fotopoulos. In 2004, she served as co-head coach with her husband at LSU. They finished with an 8–11–1 overall record (2–8–1 in the SEC). In 2006, she became an assistant coach for the Florida Gators soccer team at the University of Florida, her alma mater.  She currently lives in Tampa, Florida with her husband and their four children.  She coached multiple teams at the Tampa Bay United Soccer Club and currently coaches at Florida Premier FC where she is the GIRLS ECNLR Director.  She is also a partner for the semi-pro team, Tampa Bay Hellenic; her husband is currently the head coach.  From 2010 to 2022, Fotopoulos was the head of coach of the NCAA Division II women's soccer team at Eckerd College in St. Petersburg, Florida from 2010 until stepping down in August 2022.

Honors

Individual awards and honors
 WUSA All-Star team selection: 2003
 Second-team All-WUSA: 2002
Honda Award: 1998
 NSCAA National Player of the Year: 1998
 ESPN.com/Soccer Times National Player of the Year: 1998
 Soccer America Player of the Year: 1998
 NCAA Final Four Offensive MVP: 1998
 Southeastern Conference Player of the Year: 1996, 1998
 All-American: 1995, 1996, 1998
 SEC Tournament MVP: 1996

Team honors
 FIFA Women's World Cup (1999)
 Women's United Soccer Association Founders Cup (2002)
 NCAA Women's Soccer Championship (1999)

Statistics

College

WUSA

W-League

National team

See also

 Florida Gators
 List of Florida Gators soccer players
 List of University of Florida alumni
 List of University of Florida Athletic Hall of Fame members

References

External links
" Danielle Fotopoulos, Soccer, Sports Illustrated (February 11, 1999).  Retrieved May 6, 2010.
USSoccer.com, " Danielle Fotopoulos Retires from International Soccer," press release (February 22, 2007).  Retrieved May 6, 2010.
Soccer Times profile
University of Florida coach bio
University of Florida player bio

1976 births
Living people
Carolina Courage players
Florida Gators women's soccer coaches
Florida Gators women's soccer players
LSU Tigers women's soccer coaches
SMU Mustangs women's soccer players
Sportspeople from Seminole County, Florida
People from Camp Hill, Pennsylvania
People from Altamonte Springs, Florida
United States women's international soccer players
1999 FIFA Women's World Cup players
FIFA Women's World Cup-winning players
Female sports coaches
American women's soccer players
Women's association football forwards
American soccer coaches
Women's United Soccer Association players